The 2018–19 Guam Soccer League (Budweiser Soccer League for sponsorship reasons) is the 30th season of Guam Soccer League, Guam's first-tier professional soccer league.

The season started on 13 October 2018, and concluded on 27 April 2019, with each team playing 21 matches.

Teams
A total of eight teams competed in the league, reduced from the previous season of 17 teams. NAPA Rovers were the defending champions. Guam U-19 (also known as Manhoben Lalåhi) entered this season.
BOG Strykers
Islanders
LOA Heat
NAPA Rovers
Quality Distributors
Guam Shipyard
Sidekicks
Guam U-19

League table

Results

See also
2019 Guam FA Cup

References

External links
Guam Football Association
Soccerway

Guam Soccer League seasons
Guam
2018–19 in Guamanian football